Club Atlético San Martín (mostly known as San Martín de Tucumán) is an Argentine sports club founded in 1909 and based in the city of San Miguel de Tucumán, Tucumán Province. The club is notable for its football team, which currently plays in the Argentine Primera B Nacional, the second division of the Argentine football league system.

Other sports practised at the club are field hockey, handball, martial arts, rugby union, swimming, tennis and volleyball.

History
San Martin played every season in the Nacional championship between 1968 and 1985. El Santo has also played 3 seasons in the Argentine Primera División, in 1988–89, 1991–92 and in 2008–09.

The club's most notable victory was a 6–1 win over Boca Juniors in La Bombonera on November 20, 1988. After playing the 2008–09 season in Argentina's First Division, San Martín was relegated to Primera B Nacional. In 2011, after losing the Promoción, San Martín was relegated again to a lower division, the Torneo Argentino A.

Current squad

Out on loan

Titles

National
Copa Gral. P. Ramírez (1): 1944
Primera B Nacional (1): 2007–08
Torneo Argentino B (1): 2005
Torneo Argentino C (1): 1988

Regional
 Federación Tucumana de Fútbol (20): 1919, 1923, 1940, 1941, 1943, 1944, 1945, 1947, 1949, 1953, 1954, 1955, 1956, 1966, 1967, 1969, 1970, 1971, 1974, 1976
 Liga Tucumana de Fútbol (7): 1980, 1981, 1982, 1984, 1985, 1987, 2004
 Copa Competencia (7): 1921, 1922, 1936, 1940, 1947, 1948, 1964
 Copa de Honor (12): 1922, 1943, 1945, 1946, 1947, 1949, 1950, 1951, 1955, 1965, 1973, 1974
Copa de Preparación (1): 1975

References

External links

 

 
Association football clubs established in 1909
Basketball teams in Argentina
Argentine rugby union teams
Argentine field hockey clubs
Argentine volleyball teams
Argentine handball clubs
1909 establishments in Argentina